Huangmei may refer to:

Huangmei County (黄梅县), Huanggang, Hubei, China
Huangmei opera, Chinese opera originating from Anhui
Huangmei, Huangmei County (黄梅镇), a town in Huangmei County, Huanggang, Hubei, China